Dhaka Government Muslim High School is a secondary school in Lakshmi Bazaar in Dhaka, Bangladesh. It is one of the oldest schools in Dhaka.

Notable alumni
 Abdullah-Al-Muti, educationist
 Khwaja Khaeruddin, politician
 Nurul Momen, playwright
 ANM Bazlur Rashid, educationist
 Abdur Razzak, National Professor
 Khwaja Wasiuddin, Lt. General
Kazi Abdul Baset, painter

Gallery

References

Old Dhaka
Schools in Dhaka District
1874 establishments in India
High schools in Bangladesh
Educational institutions established in 1874
Islam in Dhaka